Neumayer Glacier is a glacier, 8 nautical miles (15 km) long and 2 nautical miles (3.7 km) wide, which flows east along the north flank of the Allardyce Range to the west side of the head of Cumberland West Bay, South Georgia. Charted by the Swedish Antarctic Expedition under Otto Nordenskiöld, 1901–04, and named for Georg von Neumayer.

Between 2005 and 2009, the glacier retreated .

See also
 List of glaciers in the Antarctic
 Glaciology

Gallery

References

Glaciers of South Georgia